"Run Away"  is a 1977 disco single written by Ronnie James and Vincent Montana, Jr. and performed by the Salsoul Orchestra with featured vocals by Loleatta Holloway.  The single was from the band's Magic Journey album.  Along with the tracks, "Magic Bird of Fire", and "Getaway", "Run Away" went to #3 on the US disco chart.  On the soul chart, "Run Away" peaked at #84.

Cover Versions
In 1997, Nuyorican Soul covered the song, with featured vocals by La India.  This version went to number one on the US dance charts.
In 2009, British jazz singer

See also
 List of number-one dance singles of 1997 (U.S.)

References

1977 singles
1977 songs
1997 singles
Loleatta Holloway songs
Disco songs